Byron Russell "Butch" McDonald (November 21, 1916 – January 8, 2006) was a Canadian ice hockey left winger who played 66 games in the National Hockey League with the Detroit Red Wings and Chicago Black Hawks between 1939 and 1945. The rest of his career, which lasted from 1934 to 1951, was spent in various minor leagues. He was born in Assiniboia, Saskatchewan.

Playing career
Byron McDonald played 66 games in the NHL for the Detroit Red Wings and Chicago Black Hawks in 1939–40 and 1944–45.

Career statistics

Regular season and playoffs

External links
 

1916 births
2006 deaths
Calgary Stampeders (ice hockey) players
Canadian expatriates in the United States
Canadian ice hockey left wingers
Chicago Blackhawks players
Detroit Red Wings players
Indianapolis Capitals players
Ice hockey people from Saskatchewan
Kansas City Pla-Mors players
Minneapolis Millers (AHA) players
Moose Jaw Canucks players
New Haven Eagles players
People from Assiniboia, Saskatchewan
Pittsburgh Hornets players
Pittsburgh Yellow Jackets (EHL) players
Regina Capitals players